Ad Mortem Festināmus is a monodic song (fol. 26v) from the 1399 manuscript Llibre Vermell de Montserrat. Its lyrics deal with the inevitability of death and the need to stop sinning. Its first few verses overlap with those of “Scribere Proposui”, a song from the 1582 Piae Cantiones. It has been recorded by a variety of artists, including the electronic neo-medieval act Qntal, that gave new music to the lyrics and made it a club hit in 1992.

Lyrics
As written in the original manuscript, with line breaks added, parts marked with “iterum” written out in full, “u” and “v” differentiated, punctuation modernized, and abbreviations expanded:

Modern recordings

Jordi Savall, Hespèrion XX (album Llibre Vermell de Montserrat - siglo XIV, 1978)
The New London Consort directed by Philip Pickett (album Llibre vermell, pilgrim songs & dances, 1992)
Qntal (album Qntal I, 1992)
Capilla Musical y Escolanía de la Santa Cruz del Valle de los Caídos & Atrium Musicae, directed by Luis Lozano & Gregorio Paniagua (album Canto Antiguo Español, 1994)
Alla francesca (album Llibre Vermell de Montserrat, cantigas de Santa Maria, 1994)
Ensemble Micrologus (album In Festa, 1995)
Gothart (album "Stella Splendens", 1997)
Studio der Frühen Musik directed by Thomas Binkley (album Secular music c1300, 1998)
Companyia Elèctrica Dharma: "Festinamus (reprise)" (album Llibre Vermell, 2002)
Ioculatores (album Media Vita in Morte Sumus, 2004)
Lamia (album La Maquina de Dios, 2006)
Choeur de Chambre de Namur (album Llibre Vermell, 2007)
Luc Arbogast (album Canticum in Terra, 2012)
Subway to Sally (album Mitgift, 2014)

14th-century songs
Medieval compositions